Sotakanal is a village in Dharwad district of Karnataka, India.

Demographics 
As of the 2011 Census of India there were 152 households in Sotakanal and a total population of 855 consisting of 454 males and 401 females. There were 88 children ages 0-6.

References

Villages in Dharwad district